Daniel Dae Kim (born Kim Dae-hyun; August 4, 1968) is a South Korean-American actor. He is known for his roles as Jin-Soo Kwon in Lost, Chin Ho Kelly in Hawaii Five-0, Gavin Park in Angel, and Johnny Gat in the Saints Row video game series. He also runs a production company, 3AD, which is currently producing the television series The Good Doctor. He portrayed Ben Daimio in the superhero film Hellboy (2019) and provided the voice of Chief Benja in the Disney animated film Raya and the Last Dragon (2021).

Early life 
Kim was born in Busan, South Korea, the son of mother Jung Kim and father Dr. Doo-tae Kim, and moved to the United States with his family when he was one year old. He grew up in New York City, Easton, and Bethlehem, Pennsylvania. He graduated from Freedom High School in Bethlehem in the Lehigh Valley region of eastern Pennsylvania.

In 1990, Kim graduated from Haverford College in Haverford, Pennsylvania with  double bachelor's degrees in theater and political science. He went on to earn an MFA from New York University's Graduate Acting Program in 1996.

Career 

After graduation, Kim made a name for himself playing numerous roles in a wide variety of television programs. He appeared in CSI: Crime Scene Investigation as a treasury agent as well as episodes of Star Trek: Voyager, Star Trek: Enterprise, Charmed, The Shield, Seinfeld, NYPD Blue, and ER. He was a regular on the short-lived Babylon 5  spin-off Crusade and had recurring roles on Angel and 24. He also portrayed Dr. Tsi Chou in a 2008 miniseries based on the acclaimed Michael Crichton novel The Andromeda Strain.

Kim's film credits include a Shaolin monk in American Shaolin (1992), which enabled him to showcase his skills in Tae Kwon Do. Then came a small part in Spider-Man 2 (2004) as a scientist working in Doctor Octavius' laboratory, and the drama Crash (2004). He also had minor roles in films such as The Jackal (1997), For Love of the Game (1999), Hulk (2003), and The Cave (2005).

2004–2010: Lost and mainstream prominence 
From 2004 to 2010, Kim served as a regular cast member on the ABC series Lost, in which he played Jin-Soo Kwon, a lowly Korean fisherman-turned-hitman who crashes onto a mysterious island with his wife, Sun-Hwa Kwon (Yunjin Kim). Since the role required him to speak exclusively in Korean, he said he was forced to quickly relearn the language, which he had not spoken with any great frequency since high school. He would go on to play the character up until the 2010 series finale. Throughout the show's run, he, along with his fellow cast members, received numerous accolades, including a 2006 Screen Actors Guild Award for Best Ensemble. He was individually honored with an AZN Asian Excellence Award, a Multicultural Prism Award, and a Vanguard Award from the Korean American Coalition, all for Outstanding Performance by an Actor. Kim was also named one of People Magazine's "Sexiest Men Alive" in 2005.

2010–2017: Hawaii Five-0 
In February 2010, shortly after Lost's conclusion, it was announced that Kim would join the CBS reboot Hawaii Five-0 as Chin Ho Kelly, the role originally made famous by actor Kam Fong. He was the first actor to be officially cast on the show. That series premiered on September 20, 2010, to strong ratings and solid critical acclaim.

In addition to acting, Kim made his directorial debut with the Hawaii Five-0 season five episode "Kuka'awale". He departed the show in late June 2017 prior to the eighth season due to a salary dispute with CBS. He had been seeking pay equality with co-stars Alex O'Loughlin and Scott Caan, but CBS would not agree to it.

Kim co-starred in The Divergent Series: Insurgent, the sequel to 2014's Divergent, playing Jack Kang, the leader of the Candor faction.

2018–present: Producing and The Good Doctor 
As the founder of the film and television production company 3AD, Kim in January 2014 signed a first-look development deal with CBS Television Studios, the first of its kind with an Asian-American actor. 3AD is currently producing the ABC television series The Good Doctor, based on the 2013 South Korean series of the same name. He is an executive producer on The Good Doctor and joined the show during its second season in the role of chief of surgery, Dr. Jackson Han.

In 2019, Kim played the role of Ben Daimio in the reboot film Hellboy. He replaced Ed Skrein in the role to avoid a whitewashing controversy, as the character was Asian-American in the original comics. Kim provides the voice of Chief Benja in the Disney animated film Raya and the Last Dragon, which was released in March 2021.

Other projects 
Kim is the voice of the character Johnny Gat for the Saints Row video game series. He provided the voice for Metron in the final two episodes of Justice League Unlimited.

In a return to his theater roots, Kim played the King of Siam in Rodgers & Hammerstein's The King and I from June 12–28, 2009 at the Royal Albert Hall in London, England. In January 2016, it was announced Kim would make his Broadway debut as the King of Siam in Rodgers & Hammerstein's The King and I from May 3 – June 26, 2016, at the Lincoln Center Theatre in New York.

Personal life 

Kim has continued to split his time between Los Angeles and Hawaii, where he has been living with his wife and two sons. During the later seasons of Lost, he continued his residency after being cast in Hawaii Five-0. He served as a speaker at the 2014 University of Hawaii commencement ceremony.

On March 19, 2020, Kim announced that he had tested positive for COVID-19;  on March 30, 2020, Kim announced that he had recovered.

Kim is an avid collector of fine vintage watches. Some of his watches from his personal collection have been featured in some of his films.

Activism 
Kim has voiced concerns about Asian American discrimination in the United States. After testing positive for COVID-19, he spoke out against the xenophobia and racism related to the COVID-19 pandemic, stating: "Please, please stop the prejudice and senseless violence against Asian people. ... Yes, I'm Asian. And yes, I have coronavirus. But I did not get it from China, I got it in America. In New York City. Despite what certain political leaders want to call it, I don't consider the place where it's from as important as the people who are sick and dying."

Filmography

Film

Television

Video games

Awards and nominations

References

External links 

Daniel Dae Kim interview  with Patrol magazine

1968 births
Living people
20th-century American male actors
21st-century American male actors
American film actors of Asian descent
American male actors of Korean descent
American male film actors
American male musical theatre actors
American male television actors
American male video game actors
American male voice actors
Bryn Mawr College alumni
Freedom High School (Pennsylvania) alumni
Haverford College alumni
IHQ (company) artists
Male actors from Honolulu
Male actors from Pennsylvania
People from Busan
People from Easton, Pennsylvania
South Korean emigrants to the United States
South Korean expatriates in the United States
Tisch School of the Arts alumni